Himantolophus compressus is a species of footballfish, a type of anglerfish. The fish is bathypelagic and non-migratory; it can be found in the Atlantic Ocean off the coast of Madeira and southern Portugal.

The species is known only from the holotype, now lost. The specimen had a length of 130 mm.

References

Himantolophidae
Deep sea fish
Fish described in 1912